San Lorenzo in Campo is a comune (municipality) in the Province of Pesaro e Urbino in the Italian region Marche, located about  west of Ancona and about  south of Pesaro.

The main attraction is the Gothic church of San Lorenzo, once part of a Benedictine abbey.

References

Cities and towns in the Marche